Luís Henrique  may refer to:

 Luís Henrique (footballer, born 1960), Luís Henrique Dias, Brazilian football goalkeeper
 Luís Henrique (footballer, born 1968), Luís Henrique Pereira dos Santos, Brazilian football midfielder
 Luís Henrique (footballer, born 1979), Luís Henrique Silveira, Brazilian football left-back
 Luis Henrique (fighter) (born 1993), Brazilian mixed martial artist
 Luís Henrique (footballer, born 1998), Luís Henrique Farinhas Taffner, Brazilian football forward
 Luis Henrique (footballer, born 2001), Luis Henrique Tomaz de Lima, Brazilian football forward

See also
Luis Enrique (disambiguation)